Schoenionta vespiventris is a species of beetle in the family Cerambycidae. It was described by James Thomson in 1868.

References

Saperdini
Beetles described in 1868